Eyüpspor is a Turkish professional football club that is located in the Eyüp district of Istanbul. The team colours are lavender and yellow. Their home ground is Eyüp Stadium, which has a capacity of 2,500.

History
Eyüpspor played in the Istanbul First League from 1934 to 1937.

Rivalries
Eyüp has a strong rivalry with Fatih Karagümrük and Beykoz 1908, which has caused riots during the matches.

Players

Current squad

Other players under contract

Out on loan

League participation
 TFF First League: 1982–83, 1987–94, 2021–
 TFF Second League: 1970–73, 1984–87, 1994–01, 2002–14, 2015–21
 TFF Third League: 2001–02, 2014–15
 Turkish Regional Amateur League: 1959–70, 1973–82, 1983–84

References

External links
Official website
Eyüpspor on TFF.org

 
Association football clubs established in 1919
Eyüp
1919 establishments in the Ottoman Empire